Quinn Michael Pitcock (born September 14, 1983) is a former American football defensive tackle who played in the NFL. He played college football for Ohio State University, and earned consensus All-American honors.  He was drafted by the Indianapolis Colts in the third round of the 2007 NFL Draft, and played a single regular NFL season for the Colts.

Early years
Pitcock was born in Piqua, Ohio.  He attended Piqua High School, and played defensive tackle for the Piqua Indians high school football.  He received all-state honors as a senior in 2001, and was rated as a Top 100 college prospect by Scout.com.

College career
Pitcock attended Ohio State University, where he played for coach Jim Tressel's Ohio State Buckeyes football team from 2002 to 2006.  As a junior in 2005, he was a second-team All-Big Ten selection; as a senior in 2006, he was a first-team All-Big Ten selection and a consensus first-team All-American, and was awarded the Bill Willis Trophy.

Professional career
Pitcock was drafted by the Indianapolis Colts in the third round (98th overall) of the 2007 NFL Draft. He opted to retire after just one season in the NFL due to bouts of depression and video game addiction.

During his retirement, the Indianapolis Colts and Quinn's agents helped him to rehab after being diagnosed with mild depression and ADHD. The Colts considered letting him compete for a roster spot during their 2010 training camp, but felt it would be a distraction to the team.

After being waived from the reserve/did not report list by the Colts, Pitcock officially came out of retirement and signed with the Seattle Seahawks on August 4, 2010. However, he was waived by the Seahawks during final cuts on September 4, 2010.

On July 29, 2011, Pitcock signed with the Detroit Lions.

Pitcock was assigned to the Orlando Predators of the Arena Football League in 2012. On January 16, 2014, Pitcock was traded to the Arizona Rattlers in exchange for LaMark Brown, Joe Gibbs, Arness Ikner and Justin Wells.

References

External links
 Seattle Seahawks bio 

1983 births
Living people
People from Piqua, Ohio
Players of American football from Ohio
American football defensive tackles
Ohio State Buckeyes football players
All-American college football players
Indianapolis Colts players
Seattle Seahawks players
Detroit Lions players
Orlando Predators players
Arizona Rattlers players